Stephen Robert Juzwik (June 18, 1918 – June 5, 1964) was an American football running back in the National Football League (NFL) for the Washington Redskins.  He also played in the All-America Football Conference (AAFC) for the Buffalo Bisons/Bills and the Chicago Rockets.  He played college football at the University of Notre Dame and was drafted in the 21st round of the 1942 NFL Draft. He wed Rosemary Brady and together they had three children—Kathy, Ellen, and Steve. He is the grandfather to Rosemary Kremkau, Paul Brunner, Laura Tomase, Patrick Brunner, and Julie Thuline.

References

External links
 
 New York Times Obituary

1918 births
1964 deaths
American football running backs
Buffalo Bills (AAFC) players
Buffalo Bisons (NFL) players
Chicago Rockets players
Great Lakes Navy Bluejackets football players
Notre Dame Fighting Irish football players
Washington Redskins players
Players of American football from Gary, Indiana